The lateral sural cutaneous nerve of the lumbosacral plexus supplies the skin on the posterior and lateral surfaces of the leg.  The lateral sural cutaneous nerve originates from the common fibular nerve(L4-S2) and is the terminal branch of the common fibular nerve.

Sural communicating branch 
One branch, the sural communicating nerve or colloquially known as the peroneal anastomotic (n. communicans fibularis), arises from sciatic origins near the head of the fibula, crosses the lateral head of the gastrocnemius to the middle of the leg, and joins with the medial sural cutaneous nerve to form the sural nerve

Variation 
Another branch observed, that is mentioned in passing in previous literature is the medial branch of the lateral sural cutaneous nerve.

In a 2021 study by Steele et al. (Annals of Anatomy), a medial branch of the lateral sural cutaneous nerve was observed in approximately 36% of lower extremities dissected (n=208) with an average diameter of 1.47 ± 0.655 mm with a 95% CI of 1.31 – 1.625 mm. This branch was noted to travel in a subcutaneous plane over the sural nerve to the posteromedial aspect of the ankle. "The lateral branch of the LSCN traveled the expected course over the fibula in the superficial fascia of the posterolateral compartment of the leg, while the medial branch terminates into the lower posteromedial aspect of ankle."

Additional images

References

External links
Referenced papers:
 Steele et al. 208 sample cadaveric review 2021
 Ramakrishnan et al.systematic review on sural nerve formation 2015

Anatomy web references
 
 
 Cutaneous field

Nerves of the lower limb and lower torso